R Chamaeleontis (abbreviated to R Cha), also known as HD 71793, is a Mira variable located in the southern circumpolar constellation Chamaeleon. It has an apparent magnitude that ranges from 7.5 to 14.1, which is below the limit for naked eye visibility.

This star was first reported to be variable in 1906, the first to be discovered in the constellation of Chamaeleon.

R Cha has a stellar classification that has been recorded between M4e near maximum and M8e near minimum. It is an asymptotic giant branch star that has exhausted its core hydrogen and helium and is now fusing hydrogen and helium in separate shells outside its core. It has expanded to about  although this varies as it pulsates. The effective temperature also varies as the star pulsates, corresponding to the change in the spectral class.

References

Chamaeleontis, R
Mira variables
Chamaeleon (constellation)
071793
Emission-line stars
M-type giants